This is a list of submissions to the 75th Academy Awards for Best Foreign Language Film. The Academy of Motion Picture Arts and Sciences has invited the film industries of various countries to submit their best film for the Academy Award for Best Foreign Language Film every year since the award was created in 1956. The award is handed out annually by the Academy to a feature-length motion picture produced outside the United States that contains primarily non-English dialogue. The Foreign Language Film Award Committee oversees the process and reviews all the submitted films.

For the 75th Academy Awards fifty-four films were submitted. Afghanistan, Bangladesh and Chad submitted films for the first time. The previous year's winner Bosnia & Herzegovina did not submit a film. The Brazilian submission, City of God was considered one of the favorites, but it did not receive a nomination in the Best Foreign Film category. When the film was released the following year in the US, it garnered nominations in four mainstream categories including Best Screenplay and Best Director. If the film had been nominated in the Best Foreign Film category, it would have been ineligible for awards the following year because films cannot receive Oscar nominations in two different ceremonies. The winner of the Academy Award for Best Foreign Language Film was Germany's Nowhere in Africa which was directed by Caroline Link.

Submissions

Notes

  Afghanistan, which had been liberated from Taliban rule only a year before, submitted their first-ever film for consideration. The movie, about Afghan-Americans, was filmed mostly in English, but partially in Dari. When the film was shown in Afghanistan, it was entirely dubbed into Dari and it was this version that was sent to the Oscars. At first, the Academy claimed that the submission did not quite conform to the rules, however, the film, whose director had been murdered before post-production was finished, was accepted.
  Hong Kong elected to send an action film, The Touch, that was disqualified because the dialogue was completely in English, and not in a foreign language
  Palestine tried to submit Divine Intervention, forcing the Academy to make a decision about whether it would accept Palestine as a country. AMPAS determined that Palestine was not a country, and therefore could not submit a film. They also said that there had been no "national selection committee" that chose Divine Intervention, as required by the rules. It was also unclear how the film would be released in its home country according to the rules, since Palestine had no internationally recognized boundaries. This decision was much criticized, especially since countries like Taiwan, Puerto Rico and Hong Kong, none of which recognized as sovereign nations by the United Nations, had been submitting movies for years. AMPAS reversed its decision the following year, and allowed Divine Intervention to compete.
  The United Kingdom sent The Warrior, a British-produced film set in India, spoken entirely in Hindi, and filmed by Asif Kapadia, a British director of Indian descent. However, the Acadmy asked to submit another film since AMPAS rules stated that all films had to be in a language indigenous to the submitting country. The Warrior was not acceptable, AMPAS argued, because Hindi was not a language indigenous to the United Kingdom, and the film was not about, nor set among British people. Had the film been set among the Hindi-speaking community in the UK, it would have been approved. BAFTA appealed to the Academy to reconsider, but to no avail. The film won Best British Film at the BAFTA awards the following year.  Britain ended up choosing Eldra, a film in Welsh. In 2006, AMPAS changed the rules to allow countries to choose films which were not in the language of the submitting country. Canada was the first to take advantage of this new rule by submitting Water, which was also in Hindi.

References

75